The name Anna has been used for five tropical cyclones in the Atlantic Ocean, as well as one in the Northwest Pacific Ocean.

Atlantic Ocean:
Hurricane Anna (1956), short-lived minimal hurricane that struck south of Tampico, Mexico
Hurricane Anna (1961), Category 2 hurricane that moved through the Caribbean Sea; caused one death and moderate damage in Central America
Hurricane Anna (1965), fast-tracking hurricane across the northeastern Atlantic Ocean; extratropical remnants dissipated near Ireland
Tropical Storm Anna (1969), long-lived tropical storm tracking from the tropical Atlantic Ocean to south of Nova Scotia
Tropical Storm Anna (1976), tracked across the northeastern Atlantic Ocean; its remnants executed a counter-clockwise loop near the Azores

Northwest Pacific Ocean:
Tropical Storm Anna (1947) (T4701), short-lived tropical storm that struck Mindanao

See also 
List of storms named Ana

Atlantic hurricane set index articles
Pacific typhoon set index articles